Goom Radio is a mobile Internet radio service. The Goom Radio Factory allows online broadcasters to create custom online radio brands.  It is a free service, available world-wide. A Goom radio application can be downloaded for free on the iPhone, iPod Touch, iPad, BlackBerry, Nokia, and Android.

History
Goom Radio launched in 2008 in France by Emmanuel Jayr and Roberto Ciurleo, former executives at Top 40 network NRJ.  In 2010, Jeff Z joined Goom as the Vice President and Director of Programming (August 2010 - March 2011). Prior to Goom Radio, Jeff Z was handling artist management and event production at AMPM Entertainment with previous experience as Program Director for WKTU in New York as well as CBS’s owned radio in California, KZZO. On February 3, 2011, It was announced that due to financial difficulties, the GOOM US workforce had to be laid off. As Of 2014, GOOM Radio's Business To Consumer Service has ceased to exist, Now offers Radio Support Services to Business Clients under a Business to Business Model.

Product
G-Sound is the proprietary technology used to enhance the music on Goom. The lossless audio files are adjusted for range of volume, equalization and the general sound quality.

In addition to delivering content, Goom allows music professionals to choose the music on the central station. On-air personalities, artist interviews and live radio shows are also available.

Funding
Goom Radio is funded from the sale of online streaming and display advertising, in addition to financial backing from the venture capital firms Wellington Partners, Partech International and Elaia Partners. In Spring of 2008, Goom raised $16 million for its funding.

The company has partnered with Coca-Cola, 2010 FIFA World Cup, Converse, Tommy Hilfiger, Guitar Hero, EURORSCG, AllHipHop, and FriendsOrEnemies.

Premium stations
Goom Radio has 16 channels, including Tommy Hilfiger’s "LOUD Radio".

Stations On GOOM US:
 Frenchy Box (French Pop)
 In The Club (Dance)
 Prysm Radio (DJ Clubbing/Dance)
 The Machine by Guitar Hero (Hard Rock)
 Loud Radio (Indie Rock)
 Esquire Radio (Indie Rock)
 Suite 313 (Lounge)

The stations are simulcasts of their duplicates from The French GOOM Radio Service in except for LOUD Radio and Esquire (those are only found on US Version)

Radio personalities

Former Goom DJs include the following:
 Gaston Stinger, currently djing, producing and acting from New York to Los Angeles
 Joe Trohman, lead guitarist of Fall Out Boy
 Erik B.
 Sonja
 Stabwalt, aka Walter Flakus, former member of Stabbing Westward
 BLanz (Bryan Lanz)
 Nicholaus "Niko" Petrou (Now at The New 92.3 Amp Radio (WNYL)
 Zach Sang (Television Host at Nickelodeon and Radio Host of Zach Sang Show (Westwood One Radio Networks))
 Shelley (Now at Z100 New York (WHTZ)
 Heff (Producer of Zach Sang And The Gang)
 Craig, aka Craigularguy, aka Craigmatic discharge, aka Craiggreg (moved to L.A.)

Former Radio Shows

 Miss Stacy's 20 on AllHipHop Radio (END DUE TO DOWNSIZING)
 Al-B & Rad Prime Show on The Machine
 FOE Live with Schwenker FOE Radio (Ended Due to Downsizing and Elimination of The GOOM Radio Rendition of FOE Radio)
 EARRLY Show with Will 2 B on AllHipHop Radio
 DJ Unique's Mix on AllHipHop
 Zach Sang and The Student Body (Now The Zach Sang Show at WestwoodOne Networks)
 The Ham Radio Show (Broadcasting at hamradioshow.com as of 2018)

Similar organizations
 Deezer
 iLike
 Last.fm
 MeeMix
 Pandora Radio
 play.it
 Radiolicious
 Slacker Radio

References

External links
Goom Radio U.S. website
Goom Radio France website

Internet radio software
Internet radio in the United States
BlackBerry software
IOS software